Kevin Aneh Kaba (born ) is a Ghana-born South African rugby union player for  in the Currie Cup and the Rugby Challenge. His regular position is flank or eighth man.

He started his career at the Eastern Province Kings academy in Port Elizabeth. He was included in the South Africa Under-20 training squad in 2014, but missed out due to injury.

References

Ghanaian sportspeople
South African rugby union players
Living people
1994 births
Sportspeople from Kumasi
Rugby union flankers
Eastern Province Elephants players
Griquas (rugby union) players